Hilton is a village and civil parish in the county of Dorset in southern England. In the 2011 census the parish—which includes the settlement of Ansty to the west—had 231 dwellings, 206 households and a population of 477.

Hilton used to form a part of the estate of the nearby Milton Abbey when it was owned by the rich Hambro family; the Hambros, who often used to entertain Edward VII, planted woods on the surrounding hills, to provide cover for pheasants. However the woods surrounding Hilton today are mostly post-war plantations of beech (Fagus sylvatica) and ash (Fraxinus excelsior) as the hills were cleared during WW2. Large areas are privately owned, although there are open access areas owned and managed by the Forestry Commission.
  
The church of All Saints is a typical Dorset country church and is mainly in the late Gothic style. In the north aisle a fine range of windows from the cloisters of Milton Abbey have been reused. The fan vault in the porch probably comes from the same source. Also from the abbey are a set of 12 panels with paintings of the Apostles: these are of high quality and early 16th century in date.

In 1870–72, John Marius Wilson's Imperial Gazetteer of England and Wales described Hilton like this:

References

External links 
 Old maps of the village

 Hilton Parish Council website

Villages in Dorset